The Michigan Wolverines men's basketball team, representing the University of Michigan, has had 74 players drafted into the National Basketball Association (NBA) since the league began holding the yearly event in 1947. Each NBA franchise seeks to add new players through an annual draft. The NBA uses a draft lottery to determine the first three picks of the NBA draft; the 14 teams that did not make the playoffs the previous year are eligible to participate. After the first three picks are decided, the rest of the teams pick in reverse order of their win–loss record. To be eligible for the NBA Draft, a player in the United States must be at least 19 years old during the calendar year of the draft and must be at least one year removed from the graduation of his high school class.

The drafts held between 1947 and 1949 were held by the Basketball Association of America (BAA). The BAA became the National Basketball Association after absorbing teams from the National Basketball League in the fall of 1949. Official NBA publications include the BAA Drafts as part of the NBA's draft history. From 1967 until the ABA–NBA merger in 1976, the American Basketball Association (ABA) held its own draft.

Through the 2022 NBA draft, a Wolverine has been chosen first overall two times in the history of the event, Cazzie Russell in 1966 and Chris Webber in 1993. Twenty-nine Wolverines have been drafted in the first round of the NBA Draft, with Franz Wagner being the latest in 2021. The most Wolverines selected in the first round of a single NBA Draft is three, which happened in 1990. Six players have been selected to either an ABA or NBA All-Star Game, four have been a member of an NBA or ABA championship winning team, and three have achieved both. Two former Wolverines have been inducted into the Naismith Memorial Basketball Hall of Fame.

Key

Players selected in the NBA Draft

References

Michigan
Michigan Wolverines NBA draft